The Black Panther is a 1977 British crime film. Its subject is the real life ex-military criminal Donald Neilson, known as the "Black Panther". It was directed and produced by Ian Merrick, his first feature, and stars Donald Sumpter, Debbie Farrington and Marjorie Yates. The film was highly controversial on its release, regarded as deeply exploitative as it was released only a few years after the occurrence of the real life events. It was slated by media figures such as Sue Lawley of Tonight. Subsequently, the film was effectively banned from viewing.

Plot
The story begins with Neilson's robbery at Heywood Post Office in Greater Manchester on 16 February 1972. Neilson loses his black-hooded mask after a fight with the owner, but manages to escape. He later travels home to his wife and teenaged daughter, who are unaware of his criminal activity. Nielson is a strict family man, expecting complete obedience from his wife and daughter, while planning his next robberies and future kidnapping. On 15 February 1974, Neilson robs the Post Office in New Park, shooting the sub-postmaster in the process. A reward in set for Neilson at £5,000. While collecting newspaper articles on his activities, Neilson reminisces on his time in the army, and prepares for the kidnapping of the wealthy heiress Lesley Whittle. He robs the Post Office at Higher Baxenden in Lancashire on 6 September 1974, where he shoots the owner. He is seen scurrying away over rooftops by witnesses, and becomes known as The Black Panther, due to his black hood, and ability to disappear into the night. On 11 November, he robs Langley Post Office, shooting both clerks in the process. The press now regards him as public enemy number one.

On 14 January 1975, Neilson travels to Highley, Shropshire and kidnaps Lesley Whittle from her bed. He drives her to Bathpool Park in Kidsgrove, Staffordshire, where he takes her sixty feet underground into a reservoir drainage shaft system. He puts her on a narrow ledge, with food and drink, so nobody can hear or find her. He tightens a steel ligature around her neck to stop her escaping while he is away arranging the ransom. The Whittle family decide to inform the police after discovering Neilsen's ransom note in the house. His demand is for £50,000.

After two failed attempts at communication, and another shooting by Neilsen, Lesley's brother Ronald receives instructions on where to deliver the ransom. He is to drive to Bathpool Park where he is to look out for a flashing light. Ronald gets lost in the dark and cannot find Bathpool Park. In the confusion, Neilsen becomes paranoid and angry, and goes back to Lesley. She falls from the ledge and dies, although it is not clear how it happens. On 23 January, the car which Neilsen stole earlier is found abandoned. After the discovery, the police manage to link the kidnapping with the Black Panther killings. On 7 March, Lesley's body is found in Bathpool Park, and on 11 December 1975, Nielsen is apprehended by two police officers after threatening them with a shotgun.

Cast
 Donald Sumpter as Donald Neilson 
 Debbie Farrington as Lesley Whittle 
 Marjorie Yates as Neilson's Wife 
 Sylvia O'Donnell as Neilson's Daughter 
 Andrew Burt as Lesley's Brother 
 Alison Key as Lesley's Sister-In-Law 
 Ruth Dunning as Lesley's Mother 
 David Swift as Detective Chief Superintendent
 Michael Barrington
 Barbara New
 Peter Copley
 Brenda Cowling
 Paul Luty
 Edwin Apps

Legacy and home media
In 2012, the film was remastered and resurrected into the British Film Institute Archives and Hall of Fame, as an important British film to rave reviews. John Patterson of The Guardian commented that The Black Panther "emerges as a meticulous, tactful, well made and highly responsible true crime movie". The film was released on DVD and Blu-Ray in 2012.

References

Bibliography
 Chibnall, Steve & Petley, Julian. British Horror Cinema. Routledge, 2002.

External links

1977 films
1970s thriller films
British thriller films
Crime films based on actual events
Films scored by Richard Arnell
Films shot at EMI-Elstree Studios
1970s English-language films
1970s British films